Kitsos Botsaris (1741 in Missolonghi – 1813, in Arta), was a leader of the Souliotes, an autonomous community in Ottoman-ruled Epirus. He played a leading role in the aftermath of the last war between the Souliotes and the Ottoman ruler of Ioannina, Ali Pasha. He was the father of Kostas Botsaris and Markos Botsaris, who fought in the Greek War of Independence.

At the war against Ali Pasha
K. Botsaris was a prominent figure of the Botsaris (or Botzaraioi) Souliotic clan, who originated from Dragani, or else Ampelia village, south of Paramythia. He was the head of the Souliotes during the wars against Ali Pasha at the end of 18th century.
In 1792 Ali Pasha planned a second expedition against Souli. He tried to deceive and arrest the Souli warriors, pretending that he is going to attack Argyrokastro and he needs their assistance. Ali sent a letter to K. Botsari written in Greek, which was published in its entirety by W. Eton in 1799:
“My  friends Captain Bozia (Botsaris) and Captain Tzavella, I , Ali Pasha, salute you … As soon as you receive my letter assemble all your warriors and come to meet me against my enemies. This is the time that I need you … Your pay shall be double that which  I give to the Albanians  because I know that you are braver than them. I will not go to the war before you come….” (Eton, p. 384).
Botsaris understood the stratagem and professed to Ali that he could not help him because could not persuade his people (the Souliotes). Captain Tzavellas who did accept Ali’s offer was soon arrested with his 70 warriors by Ali Pasha’s army. After this incident Ali marched against Souli, which was under K. Botsaris’ general command. Soon Tzavellas managed to escape from Ali by offering his 12-year-old son as hostage, and joined the Souliotes.
Botsaris ordered the Souliotes to withdraw to inaccessible mountainous fortresses with provisions for 6 months. At the same time he poisoned the local wells so that the Ottomans had no easy access to water. After some battles, the main body of the  Pasha’s army was lured into an ambush and was slaughtered. The rest  retreated in panic to Ioannina and Ali himself escaped  with difficulty, exhausting to death two of his horses while fleeing.

See also 
 Greek War of Independence
 Markos Botsaris
 Kostas Botsaris
 Souliotes

References
Sakellariou M. V. Epirus, 4000 years of Greek history and civilization. Ekdotikē Athēnōn, 1997. , p. 251

1741 births
1813 deaths
Souliotes
Macedonia under the Ottoman Empire
People from Missolonghi